Jules Guerassimoff (born 28 June 1940) in Thangool, Queensland is an Australian former Rugby Union international player.  He played 12 times for the national team between 1963 and 1967 as a flanker.

In 2000 Guerassimoff became a recipient of the Australian Sports Medal.

References

Living people
1940 births
Rugby union players from Queensland
Rugby union flankers
Australia international rugby union players
Recipients of the Australian Sports Medal
Australian people of Russian descent